Norman Rosemont (December 12, 1924 in Brooklyn, New York – April 22, 2018 in Scottsdale, Arizona) was an Emmy-winning American producer of films, television, and theatre.

He worked as a press agent before moving into theatre. He worked as a general manager of Lerner and Loewe, then began producing TV specials.

He then produced movies for television. He specialized in adaptations of classic novels. "The great classic authors wrote good stories with strong plots about people you could care for. And filming them at length - usually three hours - you can get most of the plot in."

Awards
Rosemont won the 1980 Emmy for outstanding children's programme for the TV movie The Secret Garden, first shown in 1987. All Quiet on the Western Front won the 1980 Golden Globe for best motion picture made for television.

Select credits
The Broadway of Lerner and Loewe (1962) - TV special
An Hour with Robert Goulet (1964) - TV special
Drat! The Cat! (1965) - Broadway musical
Brigadoon (1966) - TV movie
Carousel (1967) - TV movie
Kismet (1967) - TV movie
Kiss Me Kate (1968) - TV movie
Stiletto (1969)
The Bob Goulet Show (1970) - TV special
The Man Without a Country (1973) - TV movie
Miracle on 34th Street (1973) - TV movie
A Tree Grows in Brooklyn (1974) - TV movie
Great Expectations (1974) - TV movie
The Red Badge of Courage (1974) - TV movie
The Count of Monte Cristo (1975) - TV movie
The 28th Annual Primetime Emmy Awards (1976)- TV special
The Man in the Iron Mask (1977) - TV movie
The Court-Martial of George Armstrong Custer (1977).- TV movie
Captains Courageous (1977) - TV movie
The Four Feathers (1978) - TV movie
Les Miserables (1978) - TV movie
The 31st Annual Primetime Emmy Awards (1979)
All Quiet on the Western Front (1979) - TV movie
Pleasure Palace (1980) - TV movie
Little Lord Fauntleroy (1980) - TV movie
A Tale of Two Cities (1980) - TV movie
Big Bend Country (1981) - TV movie
The Hunchback of Notre Dame (1982) - TV movie
Ivanhoe (1982) - TV movie
Witness for the Prosecution (1982) - TV movie
Master of the Game (1984) - TV mini series
Camille (1984) - TV movie
The Corsican Brothers (1985) - TV movie
The Christmas Gift (1986) - TV movie
The Secret Garden (1987) - TV movie
CBS Summer Playhouse - "My Africa" (1988)
The Tenth Man (1988) - TV movie
Long Road Home (1991) - TV movie
Ironclads (1991) - TV movie
Shadow of a Doubt (1991) - TV movie
Fergie & Andrew: Behind the Palace Doors (1993) - TV movie
The Haunting of Helen Walker (1995) - TV movie
A Knight in Camelot (1998) - TV movie
Back to the Secret Garden (2000) - TV movie

Theatre Credits
My Fair Lady - company manager
Drat! The Cat! (1965) - producer

References

External links

1924 births
2018 deaths
American film producers